The 1963 Critérium du Dauphiné Libéré was the 17th edition of the cycle race and was held from 3 June to 9 June 1963. The race started in Évian and finished in Grenoble. The race was won by Jacques Anquetil of the Saint-Raphaël team.

General classification

References

1963
1963 in French sport
1963 Super Prestige Pernod
June 1963 sports events in Europe